The Colombia women's national handball team is the national team of Colombia. It is governed by the Federacion Colombiana de Balomano and takes part in international handball competitions.

Results

Pan American Championship

Junior Pan American Games

Central American and Caribbean Games

Caribbean Handball Cup

Bolivarian Games

External links

IHF profile

Women's national handball teams
Handball
National team